Sticta riparia is a species of foliose lichen in the family Peltigeraceae. Found in Puerto Rico, it was formally described as a new species in 2020 by Joel Mercado‐Díaz and Robert Lücking. Although most commonly encountered along riverbanks along the Cordillera Central, it has also been found in secondary forests. The specific epithet alludes to its riparian habitat.

References

riparia
Lichen species
Lichens described in 2020
Lichens of the Caribbean
Taxa named by Robert Lücking